Jiubao may refer to:

 Jiubao Station, Hangzhou Metro, China
 Jiubao, Jiangxi, China
 Jiubao, Zhejiang, China